Lofos is a village and a community of the Katerini municipality. Before the 2011 local government reform it was part of the municipality of Petra, of which it was a municipal district. The 2011 census recorded 1,496 residents in the village and 1,919 in the community.

Administrative division
The village of Rachi (423 residents as of 2011) is part of the community of Lofos.

Population
According to the 2011 census, the population of the settlement of Lofos was 1,496 people, a decrease of almost 12% compared to that of the previous census of 2001.

References

See also
List of settlements in the Pieria regional unit

Populated places in Pieria (regional unit)